Nick or Nicholas Thompson may refer to:

 Nick Thompson (field hockey) (born 1967), English field hockey player
 Nick Thompson (fighter) (born 1981), American mixed martial artist
 Nick Thompson (politician) (born 1966), American politician
 Nick Thompson (soccer) (born 1988), American soccer player
 Nick Thompson (sailor) (born 1986), British sailor
 Nicholas Thompson (editor), American journalist and musician
 Nicholas Thompson (golfer) (born 1982), American golf player
 Nick Thompson (businessman) (born 1968), British businessman
 Nicholas Marcus Thompson, Trinidadian-Canadian social justice advocate and union leader